Alan Harding Lendon (1903–1973) was a South Australian surgeon, aviculturist and amateur ornithologist.  He was a member of the Royal Australasian Ornithologists Union (RAOU), and served it as President in 1966–1967.  He was also strongly associated with the South Australian Ornithological Association (SAOA) until a schism in the membership, regarding the necessity of controlling the live bird export trade, led him in 1960 to form a breakaway group, the Adelaide Ornithologists Club.

References
Robin, Libby. (2001). The Flight of the Emu: a hundred years of Australian ornithology 1901–2001. Carlton, Vic. Melbourne University Press. 

Australian ornithologists
Australian surgeons
1903 births
1973 deaths
20th-century Australian zoologists
20th-century surgeons